Contact is a 1985 hard science fiction novel by American scientist Carl Sagan. It deals with the theme of contact between humanity and a more technologically advanced, extraterrestrial life form. It ranked No. 7 on the 1985 U.S. bestseller list. The only full work of fiction published by Sagan, the novel originated as a screenplay by Sagan and Ann Druyan (whom he later married) in 1979; when development of the film stalled, Sagan decided to convert the stalled film into a novel. The film concept was subsequently revived and eventually released in 1997 as the film Contact starring Jodie Foster.

Plot

The Message
As a child, Eleanor "Ellie" Arroway displays a strong aptitude for science and mathematics. Dissatisfied with a school lesson, she goes to the library to convince herself that  is transcendental. In sixth grade, her father and role-model Theodore ("Ted") dies. A man named John Staughton becomes her stepfather and does not show as much support for her interests. Ellie refuses to accept him as a family member and concludes that her mother only remarried out of weakness.

After graduating from Harvard University, Ellie receives a doctorate from Caltech supervised by David Drumlin, a well-known radio astronomer. She eventually becomes the director of "Project Argus", a radiotelescope array in New Mexico dedicated to the search for extraterrestrial intelligence (SETI). This puts her at odds with most of the scientific community, including Drumlin, who tries to have the funding to SETI cut off. To his surprise, the project discovers a signal containing a series of prime numbers coming from the Vega system 26 light years away. Further analysis reveals information in the polarization modulation of the signal: a retransmission of Adolf Hitler's opening speech at the 1936 Summer Olympics in Berlin, the first television signal powerful enough to escape Earth's ionosphere.

The President of the United States meets with Ellie to discuss the implications of the first confirmed communication from extraterrestrial beings. Ellie begins a relationship with Presidential Science Advisor Ken der Heer. With the help of her Soviet colleague Vaygay Lunacharsky, Ellie is able to set up redundant monitoring of the signal so that a telescope remains pointed at Vega at all times. A third message is discovered describing plans for an advanced machine. With no way of decoding the 30,000 pages, SETI scientists surmise that there must be a primer that they have missed.

The Machine
At the President's insistence, Ellie agrees to meet with two religious leaders, Billy Jo Rankin and Palmer Joss. A lifelong religious skeptic, Ellie tries to convince Joss of her faith in science by standing near a heavy Foucault pendulum and trusting that its amplitude will not increase. Although dismissing Rankin's outbursts, Ellie is intrigued by Joss' worldview. Shortly after, Ellie travels to Paris to discuss the machine with a newly formed consortium. The participants reach a consensus that the machine is a dodecahedron-shaped vehicle with five seats. At the conference, Ellie meets Devi Sukhavati, a doctor who left India to marry the man she loved, only to lose him to illness a year later. The final piece of the message is discovered when S. R. Hadden, a billionaire in multiple high-tech industries with an obsessive personal interest in the concept of immortality, suggests that Ellie check for phase modulation. This reveals the primer, thus allowing construction of the machine to begin.

The American and Soviet governments enter a race to construct identical copies of the machine. As errors in the Soviet project are discovered, the American machine becomes the only option. Ellie applies to be one of the five passengers, but her spot is given to David Drumlin instead. Despite heavy security, a group of extremists is able to get a bomb into one of the fabrication plants in Wyoming. During a visit by three astronomers, the bomb explodes, killing Drumlin and postponing completion of the machine indefinitely. Ellie's family also suffers when her mother has a stroke, which causes paralysis. John Staughton accuses Ellie of ignoring her own mother for years.

Ellie learns that S. R. Hadden has taken up residence aboard a private space station. While on board, he reveals that his company has been covertly building a third copy of the machine in Hokkaido, Japan. The activation date is set for December 31, 1999 and Ellie, Vaygay and Devi are given three of the seats. The other two are given to Abonnema Eda, a Nigerian physicist credited with discovering the theory of everything and Xi Qiaomu, a Chinese archaeologist and expert on the Qin dynasty. While in Japan, Ellie receives a medallion from Joss, which she carries aboard the Machine as it is activated.

The Galaxy
Once activated, the dodecahedron transports the group through a series of wormholes to a massive station near the center of the Milky Way. The station contains a surreal Earth-like beach where the five are split up. Ellie meets an extraterrestrial in a form indistinguishable from Ted Arroway, who explains his people's reasons for making contact, and tells her of their ongoing project to alter the properties of the universe by accumulating enough mass in Cygnus A to counter the effects of entropy. He also tells her that the wormhole system was built by unknown precursors, and hints at the discovery of artificial messages in transcendental numbers like π. Ellie is reunited with the other four travellers who have also met simulations of their loved ones. She captures video evidence of the encounter before the dodecahedron takes them back to Earth.

Upon returning, the passengers discover that what seemed like many hours took no time at all from Earth's perspective. They also find that all of their video footage has been erased, presumably by magnetic fields in the wormholes. After seeing that Hadden is apparently dead and that the transmission has somehow been stopped without a 26-year delay, government officials accuse the travellers of an international conspiracy. They blackmail Ellie and her fellow travellers into silence until more evidence can be found. Palmer Joss becomes one of the few people willing to believe her story that she can only justify on faith.

Acting on the suggestion of "Ted", Ellie works on a program to compute the digits of π to heretofore-unprecedented lengths. Ellie's mother dies before this project delivers its first result. A final letter from her informs Ellie that John Staughton, not Ted Arroway, is Ellie's biological father. When Ellie looks at what the computer has found, she sees a circle rasterized from 0s and 1s that appear after 1020 places in the base 11 representation of π. This not only provides evidence of her journey, but suggests that intelligence is behind the universe itself.

Publication history
Reading science fiction and fantasy as a child inspired Carl Sagan to become an astronomer. As an adult he preferred realistic stories that helped readers understand real science and history, like Robert Heinlein's "—And He Built a Crooked House—" and L. Sprague de Camp's Lest Darkness Fall. In 1978 Sagan predicted that because of science fiction, "I know many young people who would, of course, be interested, but in no way astounded, were we to receive a message tomorrow from an extraterrestrial civilization". In 1981, Simon & Schuster gave Sagan a $2 million advance on the novel. At the time, "the advance was the largest ever made for a book that had not yet been written." The first printing was 265,000 copies. In the first two years it sold 1,700,000 copies. It was a main selection of Book-of-the-Month-Club.

Sagan's friend physicist Kip Thorne gave Sagan ideas on the nature of wormholes when Sagan was developing the outline of the novel.

Sagan named the novel's protagonist, Eleanor Arroway, after two people: Eleanor Roosevelt, a "personal hero" of Sagan's wife, Ann Druyan, and Voltaire, whose last name was Arouet. The character is based on the real-life SETI researcher Jill Tarter.

The novel won the Locus Award for Best First Novel in 1986.

See also

 Communication with extraterrestrial intelligence
 Fermi paradox
 His Master's Voice
 Contact (1997 American film)

Notes

Citations

General sources 
 Davidson, Keay.  Carl Sagan: A Life.  New York: John Wiley & Sons, 1999.
 Sagan, Carl. Contact. New York: Simon and Schuster, 1985.

External links
 Larry Klaes' in-depth analysis of the film and novel

1985 American novels
1985 debut novels
1985 science fiction novels
American novels adapted into films
American philosophical novels
Books critical of religion
Conceptions of God
Debut science fiction novels
Fiction about wormholes
Fiction set around Vega
Hard science fiction
Metaphysical fiction novels
Novels about mathematics
Novels about science
Novels set in New Mexico
Search for extraterrestrial intelligence
Simon & Schuster books
Works by Carl Sagan